Kwe may be:
Tshwa language
Kwe dialect

See also
Kpwe language spoken by Kwe people